7th Central Committee may refer to:
Central Committee of the 7th Congress of the Russian Communist Party (Bolsheviks), 1918–1919
7th Central Committee of the Bulgarian Communist Party, 1958–1962
7th Central Committee of the Chinese Communist Party, 1945–1956
7th Central Committee of the Communist Party of Cuba, 2016–2021
7th Central Committee of the Socialist Unity Party of Germany, 1967–1971
7th Central Committee of the Workers' Party of Korea, 2016–2021
7th Central Committee of the Polish United Workers' Party, 1975–1980
7th Central Committee of the Romanian Communist Party, 1955–1960
7th Central Committee of the Lao People's Revolutionary Party, 2001–2006
7th Central Committee of the Communist Party of Vietnam, 1991–1996
7th Central Committee of the League of Communists of Yugoslavia, 1958–1964
7th Central Committee of the Hungarian Socialist Workers' Party, 1959–1962
7th Central Committee of the Workers' Party of Korea, 2016–present